There are at least 269 named lakes and reservoirs in Flathead County, Montana.

Lakes
 Abbot Lake, el. 
 Aeneas Lake, el. 
 Akaiyan Lake, el. 
 Akokala Lake, el. 
 Alcove Lake, el. 
 Almeda Lake, el. 
 Alpha Lake, el. 
 Amy Lake, el. 
 Angel Lake, el. 
 Angels Lake, el. 
 Ann Lake, el. 
 Arrow Lake, el. 
 Ashley Lake, el. 
 Aurice Lake, el. 
 Avalanche Lake, el. 
 Bailey Lake, el. 
 Baney Lake, el. 
 Basham Lake, el. 
 Beaver Lake, el. 
 Beaver Lake, el. 
 Beaver Woman Lake, el. 
 Beta Lake, el. 
 Big Hawk Lake, el. 
 Big Salmon Lake, el. 
 Birch Lake, el. 
 Black Lake, el. 
 Blackfoot Lake, el. 
 Blanchard Lake, el. 
 Blue Lake, el. 
 Blue Lake, el. 
 Blue Lakes, el. 
 Bootjack Lake, el. 
 Bowman Lake, el. 
 Bowser Lake, el. 
 Boyle Lake (Montana), el. 
 Boys Lake, el. 
 Bradley Lake, el. 
 Buffalo Woman Lake, el. 
 Bunker Lake, el. 
 Burnt Lake, el. 
 Cabin Lake, el. 
 Camas Lake, el. 
 Castle Lake, el. 
 Cat Lake, el. 
 Cedar Lake, el. 
 Cerulean Lake, el. 
 Chain Lakes, el. 
 Chinook Lake, el. 
 Christopher Lake, el. 
 Circle Lake, el. 
 Clayton Lake, el. 
 Cliff Lake, el. 
 Cliff Lake, el. 
 Cougar Lake, el. 
 Crater Lake, el. 
 Cree Lake, el. 
 Crevice Lake, el. 
 Cup Lake, el. 
 Cyclone Lake (Montana), el. 
 Dahl Lake, el. 
 Dan Lake, el. 
 Dean Lake, el. 
 Diamond Lake, el. 
 Dickey Lake, el. 
 Dog Lake, el. 
 Dollar Lake, el. 
 Doris Lakes, el. 
 Double Lake, el. 
 Dry Lake, el. 
 Duck Lake, el. 
 Dutch Lakes, el. 
 East Bass Lake, el. 
 Echo Lake, el. 
 Elelehum Lake, el. 
 Elk Lake, el. 
 Fawn Lake, el. 
 Feather Woman Lake, el. 
 Finger Lake, el. 
 Fire Lakes, el. 
 Fish Lake, el. 
 Fish Lake, el. 
 Flathead Lake, el. 
 Flotilla Lake, el. 
 Foy Lake, el. 
 Frozen Lake, el. 
 Garlick Lake, el. 
 Garnet Lake (Montana), el. 
 Gem Lake, el. 
 Giefer Lake, el. 
 Gilbert Lake (Montana), el. 
 Gildart Lakes, el. 
 Grace Lake, el. 
 Grayling Lake Number One, el. 
 Grayling Lake Number Two, el. 
 Gunsight Lake, el. 
 Gyrfalcon Lake, el. 
 Halfmoon Lake, el. 
 Halfmoon Lake, el. 
 Handkerchief Lake, el. 
 Hanson Lake, el. 
 Hanson-Doyle Lake, el. 
 Harbin Lake, el. 
 Harrison Lake, el. 
 Hart Lake, el. 
 Hawks Lake, el. 
 Hay Lake, el. 
 Hidden Lake, el. 
 Hidden Lakes, el. 
 Hole in the Wall Lake, el. 
 Howe Lake, el. 
 Hungry Horse Lake, el. 
 Huntsberger Lake, el. 
 Inspiration Lakes, el. 
 In-thlam-keh Lake, el. 
 Jackstraw Lake, el. 
 Jenny Lake, el. 
 John Lake, el. 
 Johns Lake, el. 
 Johnson Lake, el. 
 Kathy Lake, el. 
 Kaufmans Lake, el. 
 Kid Lake, el. 
 Kintla Lake, el. 
 Kohler Lake, el. 
 Lagoni Lake, el. 
 Lake Blaine, el. 
 Lake Douglas, el. 
 Lake Ellen Wilson, el. 
 Lake Evangeline, el. 
 Lake Five, el. 
 Lake Isabel, el. 
 Lake McDonald, el. 
 Lake Meredith, el. 
 Lake Monroe, el. 
 Lake of the Woods, el. 
 Lake Peter, el. 
 Lake Rogers, el. 
 Lake Seven Acres, el. 
 Lake West, el. 
 Lamoose Lake, el. 
 Late Lake, el. 
 Lincoln Lake, el. 
 Link Lake, el. 
 Lion Lake, el. 
 Little Beaver Lake, el. 
 Little Bitterroot Lake, el. 
 Little Bootjack Lake, el. 
 Little McGregor Lake, el. 
 Logging Lake, el. 
 Lone Lake, el. 
 Long Bow Lake, el. 
 Lore Lake, el. 
 Lost Coon Lake, el. 
 Lost Lake, el. 
 Louis Lake, el. 
 Lower Foy Lake, el. 
 Lower Quartz Lake, el. 
 Lower Stillwater Lake, el. 
 Lupine Lake, el. 
 Lynch Lake, el.

Reservoirs
 Ashley Lake, el. 
 Hubbart Reservoir, el. 
 Hungry Horse Reservoir, el. 
 Jessup Mill Pond, el. 
 Lion Lake, el. 
 Lion Lake, el. 
 Little Bitterroot Lake, el.

See also
 List of lakes in Montana
 List of lakes in Flathead County, Montana (M-Z)

Notes

FlatheadA-L)